The FIL World Luge Championships 1990 took place in Calgary, Alberta, Canada.

Men's singles

Hackl becomes the first person to win the world championships in consecutive years in this event.

Women's singles

Men's doubles

Mixed team

Medal table

References
Men's doubles World Champions
Men's singles World Champions
Mixed teams World Champions
Women's singles World Champions

FIL World Luge Championships
1990 in luge
1990 in Canadian sports
Luge in Canada